Niphecyra is a genus of longhorn beetles of the subfamily Lamiinae.

 Niphecyra interpres Kolbe, 1894
 Niphecyra papyri Lepesme, 1949
 Niphecyra rufolineata (Quedenfeldt, 1888)
 Niphecyra uniformis Breuning, 1936

References

Crossotini